Idlewild is the fourth studio album by British musical duo Everything but the Girl. It was released on 29 February 1988 by Blanco y Negro Records and Sire Records.

The album was reissued in 2012 as a remastered two-disc deluxe set by Edsel Records.

Recording and release 
Songs on Idlewild deal with domestic, daily and family topics, such as motherhood and child raising ("Apron Strings," "These Early Days"), growing up in the suburbs ("Oxford Street") and relationships ("I Always Was Your Girl", "Love Is Here Where I Live") or homesickness ("Lonesome for a Place I Know"). Its sounds flow between acoustic instrumentation, synths and drum machine. It was produced and recorded by the duo with little input from other collaborators. According to singer Tracey Thorn, at the time the album was finished, the record company considered it lacking of hits and doubted its quality, but it later received critical acclaim.

In her autobiography Bedsit Disco Queen Thorn recalls from the recording process:I am writing songs, though; lyrics that are more like short stories than pop lyrics. Perhaps they ought to be short stories. They don’t really have choruses. Maybe I’m just not very good at choruses. Ben is experimenting with synths and keyboards. He buys a drum machine and starts getting into the finer details of how to programme it. I don’t know how to operate the drum machine, or how to turn the synths on, and I’m not bothered enough to learn.

There is some disagreement about what our next record should sound like. We keep changing our minds. I still write all my songs on a guitar or at the piano, and so when I play them they sound a bit like my songs have always sounded. But Ben is writing songs with a more modern sound, using his new synths and the drum machine, and I like these too. We veer between these two possible extremes before making a record, Idlewild, which incorporates a bit of both. Maybe it’s another ‘bizarre hybrid’.

Critical and commercial reception

Idlewild was met with critical acclaim and remains a fan-favourite. It was included in the book 1001 Albums You Must Hear Before You Die.

Three songs were released as singles but failed to make a big impact. "These Early Days" peaked at No. 75 and "I Always Was Your Girl" at No. 87 in the UK, while "Love Is Here Where I Live" didn't chart. In between these releases, EBTG recorded a cover of "I Don't Want to Talk About It" which became their biggest success to that point (UK No. 3) and was later included on Idlewild's re-releases.

The album reached No. 13 in the UK and No. 38 in New Zealand and received a Gold certification for sales in excess of 100,000 copies in the United Kingdom.

Track listing

Personnel
Everything but the Girl
Tracey Thorn – vocals
Ben Watt – vocals, guitar 
Additional musicians
Ian Fraser – tenor saxophone
Steve Pearce – bass
Damon Butcher – piano, synthesizer
James McMillan – trumpet
Chucho Merchán – bass on "Lonesome for a Place I Know"
Peter King – alto saxophone
Technical
Jerry Boys – engineering

Additionally, Geoff Travis, Lindy Morrison and James McMillan are thanked in the liner notes.

Charts

Certifications

References

Everything but the Girl albums
1988 albums
Blanco y Negro Records albums
Sire Records albums